Apiba Festival is an annual festival celebrated by the chiefs and peoples of Senya Beraku in the Central Region of Ghana. It is usually celebrated in the month of June.

Celebrations 
During the festival, visitors are welcomed to share food and drinks. The people put on traditional clothes and there is durbar of chiefs. There is also dancing and drumming.

Significance 

This festival is celebrated to mark an event that took place in the past.

References 

Festivals in Ghana
Central Region (Ghana)